Acrivastine is a medication used for the treatment of allergies and hay fever. It is a second-generation H1-receptor antagonist antihistamine (like its base molecule triprolidine) and works by blocking histamine H1 receptors.

This non-sedating antihistamine is sold under the brand name Benadryl Allergy Relief in the United Kingdom by McNeil Laboratories. It should not be confused with Benadryl Once a Day which has cetirizine as the active ingredient and is also sold by McNeil in the UK, nor with the American Benadryl, which uses diphenhydramine as its active ingredient. It is available as an over-the-counter medicine in the UK, and is available with or without pseudoephedrine under the Benadryl brand.

In the U.S., acrivastine is the active ingredient in the Semprex brand. Semprex-D also contains the decongestant pseudoephedrine. Semprex-D is marketed in the U.S. by Actient Pharmaceuticals.

Comparisons with other popular antihistamines
Unlike cetirizine or loratadine, for which the standard dose is one tablet per day, a single acrivastine tablet may be taken up to three times a day. It is not to be taken by people over the age of 65, pregnant women, or people with compromised liver or kidney function.

References

H1 receptor antagonists
Pyridines
Pyrrolidines
Alkene derivatives
Peripherally selective drugs
4-Tolyl compounds